The Cootamundra Annual Classic, also known as the Coota Classic or Coota Annual is a bicycle handicap race starting and finishing in the New South Wales town of Cootamundra.  First run in 1955, the race is traditionally held on the last weekend in August.  Today it is one of the oldest open road races in New South Wales.

History
The race has run every year since 1955, making it one of oldest races on the Cycling NSW open calendar.  Organised by Cootamundra Cycling Club, past winners have included road professional Graeme Brown and 2010 Melbourne to Warrnambool winner Rhys Pollock. Traditionally the race was held in the last Saturday of August each year, it has now moved to fit with the NSW Cycling calendar.

Cootamundra local man Garry Crowe holds the title of the most Coota Annual wins after taking the honours in 1968, 1975 and again in 1991 at the age of 50 years old.

Course
Up until 2011 the course started in Cootamundra, traveled North through the small town Wallendbeen to Young along the Olympic Highway.  The race then turned south, travelling to Harden, then West back to Wallendbeen before returning to the finish in Cootamundra.  The course was 120 kilometres long.

From 2011 the course was shortened to 106 km with the course resembling a figure '8' centered on Cootamundra

Past winners

External links
 Enter online at Cycling NSW

Cycle races in Australia
Recurring sporting events established in 1955
1955 establishments in Australia
Men's road bicycle races